Robert Nicholas may refer to:
Robert Nicholas (MP) (1758–1826), member of Parliament for Cricklade in England
Robert Carter Nicholas Sr. (1728/9–1780), Virginia politician and judge
Robert C. Nicholas (1787–1856), U.S. senator from Louisiana
Robert C. Nicholas (New York politician) (1801–1854), New York politician
Bob Nicholas (born 1957), American politician

See also
Robert Nicolas (1595–1667), English judge and MP